Tiga Airport  is an airport on Tiga Island in New Caledonia.

Airlines and destinations

References

Airports in New Caledonia